The House of Bondage is a lost 1914 silent film drama directed by Pierce Kingsley and starring Lottie Pickford.

Cast
Lottie Pickford as Mary Denbigh
Armand Cortes as Max Crossman
Susanne Willis as Rose Legere
Robert Lawrence as Wesley Dyker
Herbert Barrington as Angel
Vivian De Wolfe as Katie Flannigan
Miss Bancroft as Mrs. Denbigh
Brian Darley as Owen Denbigh
Clyde Morris as Philip Beekman
Amelia Badarracco as Carrie Berkowitz
C. Shropshire as Herman Hoffman
Anna Jordan as Mrs. Chamberline
Julia Walcott as Big Lou
Katherine Vaughn as Vivian De Pere
Gertie Millar as Sallie Denbigh
Marion Coleman as Cisse, Rose's maid
De Forrest Dawley as Dyker's clerk
Fred Nicholls as District Attorney
Della Buckridge as Mrs. Foot
Mr. McPhee as Michael
George Moss as Evangelist
Mrs. Cortes as Mission lady
George Ricketts as Doctor
Miss Nelson as Fritzie
Miss Crane as Wanda
Miss Earl as Celeste
Miss Gormely as New girl
Gerald King as Bill Stevens

References

External links

The House of Bondage on Turner Classic Movies

American silent feature films
Lost American films
Films based on American novels
American black-and-white films
Silent American drama films
1914 drama films
1914 lost films
Lost drama films
Films directed by Pierce Kingsley
Films directed by Raymond B. West
1910s American films
1910s English-language films